Massimo Lana (born 18 July 1962) is an Italian lightweight rower. He won a gold medal at the 1988 World Rowing Championships in Milan with the lightweight men's four.

References

1962 births
Living people
Italian male rowers
World Rowing Championships medalists for Italy